Francesco Fioretti (born 14 May 1993) is an Italian ice dancer, who currently competes with Carolina Moscheni. With his former skating partner Jasmine Tessari, he won six international medals and is a four-time Italian national medalist. They have competed in the final segment at one ISU Championship.

With Sofia Sforza, he placed as high as 10th at the World Junior Championships.

Career

Early career 
Francesco Fioretti began skating at age seven in Milan and chose ice dancing immediately. He relocated to Zanica in 2007. In September 2008, he competed with Martina Montonati at a Junior Grand Prix (JGP) event in Merano, Italy, placing 17th.

In December 2008, Fioretti formed a partnership with Sofia Sforza, whom he had met in Zanica. Making their international debut, they placed 11th in September 2009 at the Junior Grand Prix in Lake Placid, New York. Sforza/Fioretti reached the free dance at three World Junior Championships, placing 20th in 2011 (Gangneung, South Korea), 10th in 2012 (Minsk, Belarus), and 13th in 2013 (Milan, Italy). Their best JGP result, fourth, came in the 2013–14 season, in Mexico City. The two were coached by Valter Rizzo and Brunilde Bianchi mainly in Zanica. On 1 October 2013, it was reported that Sforza/Fioretti had parted ways.

Fioretti and American ice dancer Lauri Bonacorsi competed together at one event, the 2014 CS Nebelhorn Trophy, finishing tenth. The two were coached by Rizzo and Bianchi in Sesto San Giovanni. After six months together, Bonacorsi and Fioretti parted ways due to difficulties relating to her move to Italy.

2015–2016 season 
Barbara Fusar-Poli asked Jasmine Tessari to try out with Fioretti. After a few months of skating together, Tessari/Fioretti formalized their partnership. The two made their international debut in September 2015, at the Lombardia Trophy. They finished fourth at the Italian Championships.

2016–2017 season 
Tessari/Fioretti won bronze at the 2016 NRW Trophy. After becoming the Italian national bronze medalists, they were sent to the 2017 European Championships in Ostrava, Czech Republic; they finished 22nd in the short dance and did not advance further.

2017–2018 season 
In December 2017, Tessari/Fioretti won bronze at the Italian Championships. In January, they qualified to the free dance and finished 18th overall at the 2018 European Championships in Moscow, Russia. They concluded their season with silver medals at the Bavarian Open and Egna Spring Trophy.

2018–2019 season 
Tessari/Fioretti opened their season with silver at the 2018 NRW Trophy and then placed fourth at two ISU Challenger Series events, the 2018 CS Lombardia Trophy and 2018 CS Ondrej Nepela Trophy. They took bronze at the 2018 Ice Star in October. In November, the two debuted on the Grand Prix series, placing eighth at the 2018 Grand Prix of Helsinki.  After winning the silver medal at the Italian Championships, Tessari/Fioretti placed fourteenth at the European Championships, and attended their first World Championships, where they placed twenty-fourth.

2019–2020 season 
Tessari/Fioretti placed twelfth at the 2019 CS Lombardia Trophy to begin the season, before making their second appearance on the Grand Prix at the 2019 Rostelecom Cup, where they placed tenth.  After their second consecutive national silver medal, the two competed at the 2020 European Championships, placing sixteenth. This would prove to be their final competition together, as their partnership ended afterward.

2020–2021 season 
Following the end of his partnership with Tessari, Fioretti formed a new partnership with Carolina Moscheni. In their debut season they won the Italian national silver medal, and then placed twenty-fifth at the 2021 World Championships.

2021–2022 season
They were sixteenth at the 2021 CS Lombardia Trophy, their season debut. They were originally on the roster for the 2021 CS Nebelhorn Trophy, but were later replaced. After Italy was designated to host a special Gran Premio d'Italia on the 2021–22 Grand Prix, Moscheni/Fioretti were named as replacements for a withdrawn team to make their Grand Prix debut on home soil. They placed twelfth at the event. They were twenty-first at their inaugural European Championships appearance, missing the cut for the free dance. They finished the season twenty-sixth at the World Championships, missing the free dance there as well.

Programs

With Moscheni

With Tessari

With Sforza

Competitive highlights 
GP: Grand Prix; CS: Challenger Series; JGP: Junior Grand Prix

With Moscheni

With Tessari

With Bonacorsi

With Sforza

With Montonati

References

External links 

 
 
 
 

Italian male ice dancers
1993 births
Living people
Sportspeople from the Province of Naples